Judgment Day: The John List Story is a 1993 American made-for-television crime drama film directed by Bobby Roth. It stars Robert Blake and Beverly D'Angelo. It was nominated for an Emmy Award in 1993.

Plot
Depiction of a fictionalized version of the crime of John List, who killed his mother, wife, and three children in 1971, before assuming a new identity, and eluding capture for over 17 years.

Cast
Robert Blake as John List
Beverly D'Angelo as Helen List
David Caruso as Chief Bob Richland
Carroll Baker as Alma List
Melinda Dillon as Eleanor
Alice Krige as Jean Syfert
Roger Cross as Dennis
Gabrielle Miller as Patricia List

References

External links

1993 films
1993 television films
1993 crime drama films
American crime drama films
Drama films based on actual events
Films about domestic violence
Films about missing people
CBS network films
Films directed by Bobby Roth
Films scored by Craig Safan
Films set in New Jersey
Films set in the 1970s
Films set in the 1980s
Films about mass murder
Crime films based on actual events
American drama television films
1990s English-language films
1990s American films